Mike Constantino is a mixed martial arts trainer, who operates the AMA Fight Club in the Whippany section of Hanover Township, New Jersey. He is the CEO of MVC Sports Management representing over 50 of the World's best Mixed Martial Arts and has brought over a dozen fighters to the UFC, including Charlie Brenneman, Ricardo Romero, Rafaello Oliveira, Andy Main, and brothers Jim Miller & Dan Miller.

History
In 2004, Constantino founded his own martial art school, American Martial Arts, a premier mixed martial arts training center offering classes in Brazilian jiu jitsu, Muay-thai kickboxing, mixed martial arts and kickboxing. Two years later, Constantino's American Martial Arts officially became the well-known MMA school, AMA Fight Club.

Prior to opening AMA in 2004, Mike was a Bodyguard for State Of The Art Security Agency (SASA) and a Tactical Instructor at ITC which is an International training camp that multiple law enforcement agencies sent their personnel to get trained in hand-to-hand combat as well as tactical shooting.  As a bodyguard Constantino got to work with many famous celebrities including being the detail leader for the 45th Annual Grammy Awards at Madison Square Garden in New York City in 2003.

In 2006, Michael Constantino formed MVC Sports Management, which focuses on management of mixed martial arts competitors, models & boxers.  Constantino has signed numerous successful fighters who currently compete in the UFC ( Ultimate Fighting Championship ).

News
On April 22, 2011, Constantino joined alongside Chris Sblendoria as Vice President to host the UCC, New Jersey's professional Mixed Martial Arts event at the Mennen Sports Arena in Morristown, NJ.

On June 4, 2011 UFC President Dana White announced after Clay Guida's win over Anthony Petis that Jim Miller from AMA Fight Club is next in line for the UFC Lightweight Title Shot.

On June 5, 2011, Mike Constantino signed  Mike Massenzio to MVC Sports management for UFC 131 against Krzysztof Soszyński.

On January 20, 2012, AMA Fight Club takes an overwhelming win, with three of its most talented fighters on UFC on FX fight card.

Undefeated Khabib Nurmagomedov overcomes the dreaded Octagon jitters to earn an impressive win over Kamal Shalorus. He discusses the big win, and dedicates his performance to a fallen friend.

Charlie Brenneman dominated Daniel Roberts in the first round.

Jim Miller brought out the best and worst of Melvin Guillard as a fighter.  Miller submitted Guillard with a rear-naked choke 2:04 into the first round of their main-event bout at UFC Fight Night on FX 1 in Nashville.

On Friday December 7, 2012, the New Jersey Martial Arts Hall of Fame inducted Mike Constantino as the MMA Trainer of the Year.

Notable fighters

  Jim Miller (UFC)
  Jamie Varner (UFC)
  Dan Miller (UFC)
  Adlan Amagov (UFC)
  Rafaello Oliveira (UFC)
  Khabib Nurmagomedov (UFC)
  Jimy Hettes (UFC)
  Emron Umerovski (UFC)
  Charlie Brenneman (UFC)
  Mike Massenzio
  Andy Main
  Ricardo Romero 
  Amanda Nunes

References

External links
AMA Fight Club
Ama Karate
MVC Management

1976 births
Living people
American male mixed martial artists
Mixed martial arts trainers
Mixed martial artists from New Jersey
Sportspeople from Clifton, New Jersey
People from Hanover Township, New Jersey
Sportspeople from Morris County, New Jersey